The 2018 Salford City Council election took place on 3 May 2018 to elect members of Salford City Council in England.

This result had the following consequences for the total number of seats on the council before the elections:

Ward results 
Asterisk denotes the sitting councillor.

Barton

Boothstown and Ellenbrook

Broughton

Cadishead

Claremont

Eccles

Irlam

Irwell Riverside

Kersal

Langworthy

Little Hulton

Ordsall

Pendlebury

Swinton North

Swinton South

Walkden North

Walkden South

Weaste and Seedley

Winton

Worsley

References

2018 English local elections
2018
2010s in Greater Manchester